The Butcher's Ballroom is the debut studio album by Swedish avant-garde metal band Diablo Swing Orchestra, released in 2006. It features all four songs from their EP and disc debut Borderline Hymns, along with 9 new songs, for a total of 13 tracks divided into two acts. It is the band's first release with singer AnnLouice Lögdlund.

It received the Biggest Surprise award at the 2006 Metal Storm Awards.

Track listing

Pre-gap
There is a pre-gap track on the album as track -1, lasting for 1:03.

Band members
 AnnLouice Lögdlund – lead vocals
 Daniel Håkansson – lead vocals, guitars, lute (setar)
 Pontus Mantefors – guitars, synthesizer, FX, vocals
 Anders "Andy" Johansson – bass
 Johannes Bergion – cello
 Andreas Halvardsson – drums

Additional musicians
 David Werthén – double bass
 Kristin Olsson – flute
 P.G. Juliusson – piano
 Tobias Wiklund – trumpet
 Emmy Lindström – violin

Production
 Pelle Saether – producer, mixed by, engineer
 Daniel Håkansson – engineer
 Pontus Mantefors – co-engineer
 Goran Finnberg – mastering
 Peter Bergting – illustrations
 Anders Johansson - art director

References

External links
 This album can be downloaded free of charge on Jamendo.com under a Creative Commons By-NC-ND 3.0 License.

2006 albums
Diablo Swing Orchestra albums
Gothic metal albums by Swedish artists
Progressive metal albums by Swedish artists
Swing revival albums
Symphonic metal albums by Swedish artists
Albums free for download by copyright owner